

UCI Road World Rankings

World Championships

UCI World Cup

Single day races (1.1 and 1.2)

Source

Stage races (2.1 and 2.2)

Source

World University Cycling Championship

Continental Championships

African Championship

Asian Championships

European Championships (under-23)

Oceania Championships

Pan-American Championships

National Championships

UCI teams

References

 
 
Women's road cycling by year